Etnies (stylized as etnies) is a footwear brand based in Lake Forest, California, United States, and is owned by Sole Technology, Inc. As of 2013, the company sponsors professional skateboarders and BMX riders, LAB more and releases signature shoe models.

History

The company was launched in 1986 and following the end of his professional skateboarding career, current owner, Pierre André Sénizergues, commenced design work at etnies shortly after the company's formation. Etnies was an emerging European brand at the time that Sénizergues joined the company and he was responsible for designing the "Senix", "Lo-Cut", "Low-Top Rap", "Intercity" and "Scam" shoe models. Sénizergues subsequently introduced the brand to the US and proceeded to build Sole Technology, with the addition of the Emerica, éS (on hiatus between 2012 and 2014, but back in production), and ThirtyTwo (snowboarding brand created in 1995) brands.

Skate park
The park has been used for a Sole Technology-sponsored skateboard competition, entitled "Goofy vs. Regular (GvR)"—goofy-footed skateboarders competed against regular-footed skateboarders—that was held in 2007 and 2008.

Charity work
In 2012, the brand donated free shoes to people who were, at the time, "homeless and needy" in Los Angeles, US as part of an Easter "shoe drive". Two thousand pairs of shoes were given away and a video of the event was also published, in which etnies CEO, Senizergues, conducted interviews with shoe recipients. etnies-sponsored athletes, Devine Calloway, BK, and Andy Bell, etnies staff, celebrity volunteers and the city's mayor at the time, Antonio Villaraigosa, also participated in the event.

Buy a Shoe, Plant a Tree
In addition to the company's charity work, etnies has also launched tree-planting projects in Costa Rica and Brazil under the title of "Buy a Shoe, Plant a Tree". In Costa Rica, etnies committed to planting a tree in the Maleku rainforest reserve for every pair of Jameson 2 Eco shoes that were sold, and sponsored athletes, Benji Weatherly, CJ Kanuha, Chris Del Moro, and Ryan Sheckler travelled to Costa Rica in March, 2011 for an inaugural tree-planting ceremony. In 2012, the project was then expanded to Brazil, in partnership with the Trees for the Future organization; the Brazilian initiative involved the planting of 100,000 trees within São Paulo's Atlantic Rainforest throughout 2012 for every purchase of the "Jameson 2" and "Jameson 2 Eco" men’s and boy's shoes, as well as the girl’s "Caprice Eco" and "Circe Eco" shoes. In 2012, Senizergues stated, "We play in our planet, and we need to take care of it. Through our Buy a Shoe, Plant a Tree project we are excited that everyone can come together to be a part of the solution – giving future generations the opportunity to see and experience the benefits these life-giving rainforests bring to the Earth.”

On April 22, 2015, Etnies celebrated Earth Day by announcing a milestone in the program: its one millionth tree planted. The brand also announced that the program, now called "Every Shoe Plants a Tree," will continue in 2015, with every pair of Etnies purchased this year becoming a tree planted in the rain forest.

Filmography
Skateboard
2007: Restless
2018: Album

BMX
2002: Forward
2007: Grounded
2017: Chapters

Sponsorships

Current Skate Team 

 Chris Joslin
 Ryan Sheckler
 Aidan Campbell
 Matt Berger
 Trevor McClung
 Nick Garcia
 Barney Page
 Nassim Lachhab
 Jake Wooten
 Andy Anderson
 Aurélien Giraud

Past Skate Team 

Rune Glifberg
Sean Malto,
Mikey Taylor
Jason Dill
Ali Boulala
Arto Saari,
Elissa Steamer
 Willow

 Mike Vallely

Current BMX Team 

 Nathan Williams
 Chase Hawk
 Aaron Ross
 Ben Lewis
 Tom Dugan
 Devon Smilie
 Reed Stark
 Jordan Godwin
 Jordan Okane

References

External links

Official website

Clothing brands of the United States
Skateboarding companies
Snowboarding companies
Clothing companies established in 1986
Companies based in Lake Forest, California
Shoe companies of the United States
2000s fashion
2010s fashion
Shoe brands
1986 establishments in California
Skateboard shoe companies